Milan Hort (born 6 February 1953) is a Slovak politician. He served as a Member of  the National Council from 1998 to 2010 and its Deputy Speaker from 2006 to 2012.

Hort was born in Červený Kameň and studied International Commerce at the University of Economics in Bratislava. After graduation, Hort worked in sales at the ZŤS factory in Dubnica nad Váhom.  Following the Velvet Revolution, Hort became a member of the Christian Democratic Movement and was elected the mayor of Nová Dubnica.

In 1998 he joined the Slovak Democratic Coalition party, which he represented, along with his successor Slovak Democratic and Christian Union – Democratic Party in the parliament for 12 years. From 2006, until the end of his parliamentary career he served as a Deputy Speaker.

Hors is married and has five children.

References

Living people
1953 births
Slovak Democratic Coalition politicians
Slovak Democratic and Christian Union – Democratic Party politicians
Members of the National Council (Slovakia) 1998-2002
Members of the National Council (Slovakia) 2002-2006
Members of the National Council (Slovakia) 2006-2010
Members of the National Council (Slovakia) 2010-2012
University of Economics in Bratislava alumni
Christian Democratic Movement politicians
People from Ilava District